CYCA may refer to:

 CYCA the ICAO code for Cartwright Airport in Newfoundland and Labrador.
 Cruising Yacht Club of Australia.
 Craft Yarn Council of America.